Arnold Ipolyi (family name originally Stummer) (20 October 1823 – 2 December 1886) was a Hungarian bishop and historian.

Life
Ipolyi was born in Ipolykeszi, Hungary (currently Kosihy nad Ipľomin, Slovakia). At the age of 13 he entered the ranks of the alumni of the Archdiocese of Esztergom, studied two years in the Emericianum at Pozsony and later at Nagyszombat, and finished at the Pázmáneum at Vienna, where he attended lectures on theology for four years. In 1844 he entered the seminary of Esztergom, took minor orders in 1845, and was ordained priest in 1847. From 1845 to 1847 he acted as tutor in the family of Baron Mednyánszky, was then curate at Komáromszentpéter (German: Komorn-Sankt-Peter), in 1848 preacher at Bratislava, in 1849 spent a short time as tutor in the family of Count Palffy, and became in this year parish priest of Zohor. Even before his ordination he concerned himself with historical and art-historical matters. In 1854 his Ungarische Mythologic came out, as the first-fruit of his work, in which he treats of the ancient religion of Hungary. Although the work won the prize offered by the Hungarian Academy of Sciences, the author afterwards withdrew it from the press, so that at the present time it is very rare. In 1860 Ipolyi became parish priest at Törökszentmiklós. Accompanied by Franz Kubinyi and Emerich Henszlmann, he made in 1862 a journey to Constantinople, where he discovered the remainder of the library of Matthias Corvinus. In 1863 he was made canon of Eger, and in 1869 director of the Central Ecclesiastical Seminary at Pest; in 1871 he became Bishop of Besztercebánya, and Bishop of Nagyvárad where he died on 2 December later that same year. Ipolyi was member of the Hungarian Academy of Sciences, as well as a member of different learned Societies at home and abroad. He was one of the founders and at first vice-president, then president of the Hungarian Historical Society. His literary activity extended into the provinces of history, art-history, archaeology, and Christian art. He enriched the Hungarian National Gallery with sixty valuable paintings. He bequeathed to Nagyvárad (today Oradea, Romania) in his will, for the purpose of founding a museum, his collections which had been brought together with a great expert knowledge of art.

Works
Ungarische Mythologic (1854)
Biography of Michael Veresmarti, an author of the seventeenth century (Budapest, 1875)
Codex epistolaris Nicolai Oláh, in the Monumenta Hungariae Historica: Scriptorum, XXV (Budapest, 1876)
Biographie der Christina Nyáry von Bedez (Budapest, 1887), in Hungarian
Historische und kunsthistorische Beschreibung der ungarischen Kronisignien (Budapest, 1886), in Hungarian.

A collection of his lesser works has appeared in five volumes (Budapest, 1887).

Bibliography
SZINNYEY, Leben und Werke ungarischer Schriftsteller, V, 145-158
POR, Leben und Werke A. Ipolyyis, Bischofs von Grosswardein (Presburg, 1886)
memorial oration on Ipolyi by FRAKNOI in Jahrbuch der Ung. Akademie der Wissenschaften, XVII, 1888

External links 
Arnold Ipolyi Elementary School in Hungary

 That entry was written by Antal Aldásy.

1823 births
1886 deaths
People from Veľký Krtíš District
19th-century Roman Catholic bishops in Hungary
19th-century Hungarian historians